"Daddy Don't You Walk So Fast" is a song written by Peter Callander and Geoff Stephens and performed by Wayne Newton. It appeared on Newton's 1972 album, Daddy Don't You Walk So Fast.

"Daddy Don't You Walk So Fast" reached #3 on the U.S. adult contemporary chart and #4 on the Hot 100.  The song spent one week at #1 on the Cashbox chart on August 5, 1972, and three weeks at #1 in Australia.  It sold over one million copies and was awarded a gold disc by the RIAA in July 1972.

The song was ranked #10 on Billboard magazine's Top Hot 100 songs of 1972 and was also was ranked number 7 on the Kent Music Report's 25 songs of 1972.

The track was produced by Wes Farrell and arranged by Mike Melvoin.

Chart performance

Weekly charts

Year-end charts

Other versions
Daniel Boone released the original version of the song as his debut single in 1971.  It reached #1 in New Zealand and South Africa and #17 on the UK Singles Chart.  It was featured on his 1971 album, Daddy Don't You Walk So Fast.
Ronnie Dove recorded the song for his 1973 country album on MCA Records.
 Herman van Keeken made a Dutch version of this song in 1971, called "Pappie loop toch niet zo snel", which became a hit in the Netherlands and Flanders.
 Roger Johnssson wrote a Swedish text and made a Swedish version of this song called "Snälla pappa vänta på mej". This version became a #1 hit on the Swedish list Svensktoppen.
 Henson Cargill released a version as the B-side of his February 1972 single, "I Can't Face the Bed Alone".  It was featured on his 1972 album, On the Road.
 Frank Ifield released a version on June 15, 1972 in Australia.
Ace Cannon released a version on his 1973 album, Baby Dont Get Hooked on Me.
Roy Clark released a version on his 1973 album, Come Live with Me.
Tony Christie
The Ray Conniff singers
Sven Libaek Orchestra
Lou Pride
Charlie Rich
The Sensations
Jerry Vale

References

External links
 

1971 songs
1971 singles
1972 singles
Songs written by Peter Callander
Songs written by Geoff Stephens
Wayne Newton songs
Henson Cargill songs
Roy Clark songs
Charlie Rich songs
Cashbox number-one singles
Number-one singles in Australia
Number-one singles in New Zealand
Number-one singles in South Africa
Song recordings produced by Wes Farrell
Songs about parenthood
Songs about children